Kacper Kostorz (born 21 August 1999) is a Polish professional footballer who plays as a forward for Korona Kielce, on loan from Pogoń Szczecin.

Career

Kostorz started his career with Podbeskidzie Bielsko-Biała. On 7 January 2022, he moved from Legia Warsaw to Pogoń Szczecin. On 17 February 2023, Kostorz was loaned until the end of the season with an option to make the move permanent to another Ekstraklasa side, Korona Kielce.

Honours
Legia Warsaw
Ekstraklasa: 2019–20, 2020–21

References

External links
 
 

1999 births
Living people
Association football forwards
Polish footballers
Legia Warsaw players
Legia Warsaw II players
Podbeskidzie Bielsko-Biała players
Miedź Legnica players
Pogoń Szczecin players
Korona Kielce players
Ekstraklasa players
I liga players
III liga players
People from Cieszyn